Prisia Wulansari Nasution or better known as Prisia Nasution (born in Jakarta, Indonesia 1 June 1984) is an Indonesian actress, model and martial artist of mixed Javanese and Batak descent.

Biography

Early life
Nasution was born in Jakarta, Indonesia on 1 June 1984.

Beginning in junior high school, Nasution joined the national training camp for the Indonesian martial art pencak silat. She later attended Swiss German University, majoring in information technology.

In 2003, during her university studies, Nasution was offered a chance to become a runway model. She accepted as she thought it would be an easy way to earn money, but soon discovered that she lacked the confidence to do it professionally; in a 2011 interview with The Jakarta Post she said her thighs were too big, making her body "defective" for modelling.

Acting career
After retiring from modelling, Nasution was cast in several TV movies. She was later cast in Ifa Isfansyah's 2011 movie Sang Penari (The Dancer) as the lead female character, Srintil, after two casting sessions; when her first audition failed, she read the original novel by Ahmad Tohari and decided that she could not take no for an answer. To prepare for the role, she spent time as a ronggeng in Banyumas, Central Java, practising dancing and learning the language spoken there; she also spent a period eating less to better portray a malnourished rural girl.

, Nasution is playing in the TV series Laskar Pelangi – The Series (Rainbow Warriors – The Series), based on the novel by Andrea Hirata. She is also writing an original screenplay about parallel lives in the 1940s and 2010s.

Awards and nominations

Personal life
Nasution was married to Ananda Siregar. The couple divorced on 4 January 2012 after going to court 11 times for discussions.

References
Footnotes

Bibliography

External links

1984 births
Living people
Citra Award winners
People from Jakarta
People of Batak descent
Javanese people
Indonesian actresses
Indonesian female models
Indonesian female martial artists